Yasra Rizvi is a Pakistani actress and writer. She played the female lead in a number of television productions, including Mann Ke Moti (2012), Woh Dobara (2014), Thora Sa Aasman (2016) and Ustani Jee (2018). In her acting career, she is known for her portrayals of women in challenging situations.

Personal life
Rizvi resides in Islamabad, Pakistan. She married Abdul Hadi in Karachi during December 2016.

Career
Rizvi started her acting career after completing her Master's from London, UK. She initially performed on stage and theatre plays and moved to television serials. She received critical acclaim for her portrayal of a single mother in Mann Ke Moti (2013) aired on Geo TV. The series was a critical and commerciall hit, also broadcast in India on Zindagi TV. Later she appeared as Fariha in Malika-Aliya (2014) and as Yasmeen in Woh Dubara (2014). In 2016, she appeared in the women-centric serial Thoda Sa Aasman, portraying the role of Fatima. Her other appearances include Iss Khamoshi Ka Matlab (2016), Kitni Girhain Baaki Hain 2 (2016), Baji Irshad (2017), Aangan (2017) and Ustani Jee (2018).

Filmography

Film

Television

Webseries

Accolades

References

External links

21st-century Pakistani actresses
Living people
Pakistani television actresses
1982 births
Western Michigan University alumni